Acropsilus is a genus of flies in the family Dolichopodidae. It is unplaced in the family, having been placed variously in subfamilies such as Sympycninae or Peloropeodinae. It is superficially similar to the Medeterinae.

Species
The genus contains 30 species:

Acropsilus albitibia Bickel, 1998
Acropsilus boharti Bickel, 1998
Acropsilus brevitalus (Parent, 1937)
Acropsilus colmani Bickel, 1998
Acropsilus eburneensis Couturier, 1978
Acropsilus errabundus Lamb, 1922
Acropsilus guangdongensis Wang, Yang & Grootaert, 2007
Acropsilus guangxiensis Wang, Yang & Grootaert, 2007
Acropsilus igori Negrobov, 1984
Acropsilus jinxiuensis Wang, Yang & Grootaert, 2007
Acropsilus kuranda Bickel, 1998
Acropsilus luoxiangensis Wang, Yang & Grootaert, 2007
Acropsilus malaita Bickel, 1998
Acropsilus maprik Bickel, 1998
Acropsilus minutulus (Vanschuytbroeck, 1951)
Acropsilus minutus Hollis, 1964
Acropsilus niger (Loew, 1869)
Acropsilus nigricornis Bickel, 1998
Acropsilus olegi Grichanov, 1998
Acropsilus opipara (Wei, 2006)
Acropsilus perminutus (Parent, 1937)
Acropsilus protractus Robinson, 1963
Acropsilus putosa Bickel, 1998
Acropsilus stekolnikovi Grichanov, 1998
Acropsilus toma Bickel, 1998
Acropsilus udot Bickel, 1998
Acropsilus vorax (Curran, 1927)
Acropsilus yunnanensis Wang, Yang & Grootaert, 2007
Acropsilus zengchenensis Wang, Yang & Grootaert, 2007
Acropsilus zhuae Wang, Yang & Grootaert, 2007

References

Dolichopodidae
Dolichopodidae genera
Diptera of Europe
Diptera of Asia
Diptera of Australasia
Diptera of Africa
Taxa named by Josef Mik